Clivina rugiceps is a species of ground beetle in the subfamily Scaritinae. It was described by Johann Christoph Friedrich Klug in 1832.

References

rugiceps
Beetles described in 1832